The Church of San Bernabé (Spanish: Iglesia de San Bernabé) is a church located in El Escorial, Spain. It was declared Bien de Interés Cultural in 1983.

References 

Bernabe, El Escorial
Bien de Interés Cultural landmarks in the Community of Madrid

See also 

 Imperial Route of the Community of Madrid